Love of My Life is a Philippine television drama romance series broadcast by GMA Network. Directed by Don Michael Perez, it stars Coney Reyes, Carla Abellana, Mikael Daez and Rhian Ramos. It premiered on February 3, 2020 on the network's Telebabad line up replacing One of the Baes. The series concluded on March 19, 2021, with a total of 80 episodes. It was replaced by I Can See You in its timeslot.

The series is streaming online on YouTube.

Cast and characters

Lead cast
 Coney Reyes as Isabella Gonzales
 Carla Abellana as Adelle Nisperos-Gonzales
 Mikael Daez as Nikolai "Niks" Gonzales
 Rhian Ramos as Raquel "Kelly" Generoso-Gonzales

Supporting cast
 Vaness del Moral as Joyce Castro
 Geleen Eugenio as Eden Layug
 Samantha Lopez as Janice Bustamante
 Maey Bautista as Charmaine "Cha-Mae" Facundo
 Ethan Hariot as Gideon "Giddy" Generoso Gonzales
 Raphael Landicho as Andrei Nisperos Gonzales
 Djanin Cruz as Diane Victorino
 Ana De Leon as Liezel Canlas
 Levi Ignacio as Arsenio "Arsing" Valdez
 Carl Guevarra as Ezekiel "Kiel" Oliveros
 Dino Pastrano as Elmer Nisperos
 Anna Marin as Asuncion "Siony" Nisperos

Recurring cast
 Tom Rodriguez as Stefano Gonzales
 Angeli Bayani as Rosanna "Osang" Layug

Guest cast
 Johnny Revilla as Enrico Gonzales
 William Lorenzo as Eduardo "Edong" Generoso / Frederick "Fred" Enriquez
 Crystal Paras as Jessa
 Angelica Ulip as Janina
 Jay Arcilla as Jopet

Production
Principal photography was halted in March 2020 due to the enhanced community quarantine in Luzon caused by the COVID-19 pandemic. Filming was continued in September 2020. The series resumed its programming on January 18, 2021.

Ratings
According to AGB Nielsen Philippines' Nationwide Urban Television Audience Measurement People in Television Homes, the pilot episode of Love of My Life earned an 8.6% rating. While the final episode scored a 19.7% rating, which is the series' highest rating.

Accolades

References

External links
 
 

2020 Philippine television series debuts
2021 Philippine television series endings
Filipino-language television shows
GMA Network drama series
Philippine romance television series
Television productions suspended due to the COVID-19 pandemic
Television shows set in the Philippines